The Martyrdom of Saint Erasmus by Dieric Bouts is, in addition to The Last Supper, a second work by the artist in the Saint Peter's church in Leuven. It is known that the Brotherhood of the Holy Sacrament certainly owned the work in 1535. Whether they had given the order to make it is unknown. The triptych was probably made c. 1464, which makes it older than The Last Supper.

Description
Torture of Saint Erasmus is depicted on the triptych. He was the patron saint of the skippers and in the Netherlands in particular of the Baltic Seafarers. His attribute was the capstan, a winch on which the anchor chains were rolled up.

Historian Johan Huizinga uses the term 'dermwinderken' for the Erasmus triptych, because the central panel shows how, according to legend, the intestines of Saint Erasmus were pulled out of his body with the help of a windlass. As a result, from the fifteenth century he was also called against stomach diseases. Erasmus undergoes this without betraying any emotion; the executioners carry out their duties seriously and Emperor Diocletian and his three companions, who attend the event, appear to be in a meditative state just as the saints on the side panels.

On the side panels two persons are depicted, on the left is the Church Father Jerome and on the right is Bernard of Clairvaux, the founder of the Cistercian Order. They are, respectively, depicted with a lion who has rid Jerome of a thorn in his leg; and a devil who lies at the feet of Bernard and symbolizes the torments that the saint has resisted. These two men have virtually no link with the subject of the central panel. Nevertheless, they have been brought together with the other figures in one landscape that runs through the panels.

Instead of bringing the narrative aspects and horror of the legend of Saint Erasmus to the fore, Bouts sought to emphasize the holiness of Erasmus, Jerome and Bernard and to present them as protectors and as objects of devotion. Some see the image of the three saints as a tribute to the three forms of holiness: Erasmus, the martyr, Jerome, the scholar, and Bernard, the mystic.

See also=
 Altarpiece of the Holy Sacrament

References

1460s paintings
Paintings by Dieric Bouts
Paintings in Leuven
Triptychs